James Sanford Ketchum (November 1, 1931 – May 27, 2019) was a psychiatrist and U.S. Army Medical Corps officer who worked for almost a decade (1960–1969) on the U.S. military’s top secret psychochemical warfare program at the Edgewood Arsenal, Maryland, which researched chemicals to be used to "incapacitate the minds" of adversaries.

Biography

Youth and education
Ketchum was born in Manhattan and brought up in Brooklyn and Queens. After graduating from Forest Hills High School, he attended Dartmouth College before receiving his undergraduate degree from Columbia University in 1952. In 1956, he received his M.D. degree from Cornell Medical School. He joined the Army that year and served his internship at Letterman Army Hospital in San Francisco (1956–57). After a psychiatry residency at the Walter Reed Army Medical Center in Washington, D.C. (1957–59), he was granted board certification in that specialty and joined researchers at the Walter Reed Army Institute of Research.

Career
In 1960, Ketchum agreed to an unconventional assignment at Edgewood Arsenal in Maryland and spent most of the next decade (1960–66; 1968-69) testing over a dozen potential "incapacitating agents", including LSD, BZ and cannabis derivatives. He played a pivotal role in psychoactive drug testing of hundreds of military volunteers — known rather prosaically as the "Medical Research Volunteer Program" — a story kept highly classified for almost fifty years until his memoir was published in 2006.

In 1964, Ketchum oversaw an important field test at the Dugway Proving Ground, in Utah. The test, code-named Project DORK, was intended to determine if an aerosol of the delirium-inducing BZ could incapacitate soldiers at distances of 500–1000 yards. Ketchum directed an army film documenting the effort called Cloud of Confusion (1964).

Ketchum had additional psychiatric training during a fellowship at Stanford University in California (1966–68); during this period, he volunteered at the Haight Ashbury Free Clinics in nearby San Francisco (he did not tell his hippie patients he was an Army doctor). He then returned to Edgewood for a final year; this was followed by tours at Fort Sam Houston (1971–73) and Fort Benning (1973–76).

Post-military
After leaving Army service as a colonel in 1976, Ketchum became an associate professor at the University of Texas Medical School and later an assistant clinical professor at the University of California, Los Angeles. As a civilian, Ketchum acquired broad experience in the area of alcohol and drug abuse and published numerous scientific articles and book chapters. His activities at teaching hospitals included many invited lectures, seminars and the direct supervision of medical students. As a clinician, he spent 30 years in hospital and outpatient settings, as well as community clinics and residential treatment centers.

Following his retirement, Ketchum resided in Santa Rosa, California until moving to Peoria, Arizona after the Tubbs Fire (2017) came within a few blocks of his home. He was a lifelong friend of Sasha Shulgin.

Ketchum died in Peoria at the age of 87 on May 27, 2019. He was survived by his fifth wife, Judy Ketchum, and two children.

Works

See also
Edgewood Arsenal human experiments
David Rioch
Incapacitating agent

References

External links
Excerpts from "Cloud of Confusion" (1964) on AOL.
Operation Delirium - 2012 New Yorker profile

1931 births
2019 deaths
Psychedelic drug researchers
Mind control theorists
United States Army Medical Corps officers
American psychiatrists
Physicians from New York City
Military personnel from New York City
People from Manhattan
Weill Cornell Medical College alumni
Dartmouth College alumni
Columbia College (New York) alumni
United States Army colonels